Federal Run is a  long 3rd order tributary to Muddy Creek in Crawford County, Pennsylvania.  This is the only stream of this name in the United States.

Course
Federal Run rises about 0.25 miles north-northwest of Kings Corners, Pennsylvania, and then flows southerly to join Muddy Creek about 0.5 miles north-northwest of Little Cooley, Pennsylvania.

Watershed
Federal Run drains  of area, receives about 45.6 in/year of precipitation, has a wetness index of 442.71, and is about 43% forested.

See also
 List of rivers of Pennsylvania

References

Rivers of Pennsylvania
Rivers of Crawford County, Pennsylvania